Higginsville is a city in Lafayette County, Missouri, within the United States. The population was 4,797 at the 2010 census.

History
Higginsville was founded in 1869 and named after Harvey Higgins, the original owner of the town site. A post office has been in operation at Higginsville since 1870.

Higginsville was formerly the site of the Missouri Confederate Soldiers' Home. After the last of the Confederate veterans died, the lands were converted into a Confederate Memorial Cemetery. This 135-acre site is preserved in memory of the more than 40,000 Missourians who fought under the Confederate flag. Captain William Clarke Quantrill is one of those interred here.

The Confederate Chapel, Cemetery and Cottage, Houx-Hoefer-Rehkop House, and Chicago and Alton Railroad Depot at Higginsville are listed on the National Register of Historic Places.

Geography
Higginsville is located on Missouri Route 13 approximately ten miles southeast of Lexington and 20 miles north of Warrensburg.

Climate

Demographics

2010 census
As of the census of 2010, there were 4,797 people, 1,961 households, and 1,208 families living in the city. The racial makeup of the city was 91.4% White, 5.3% African American, 0.1% Native American, 0.5% Asian, 0.1% Pacific Islander, 0.8% from other races, and 1.9% from two or more races. Hispanic or Latino of any race were 2.2% of the population.

There were 1,961 households, of which 30.7% had children under the age of 18 living with them, 43.7% were married couples living together, 13.1% had a female householder with no husband present, 4.9% had a male householder with no wife present, and 38.4% were non-families. 33.0% of all households were made up of individuals, and 15.2% had someone living alone who was 65 years of age or older. The average household size was 2.34 and the average family size was 2.93.

The median age in the city was 39.5 years. 23.6% of residents were under the age of 18; 9.2% were between the ages of 18 and 24; 24.4% were from 25 to 44; 24.6% were from 45 to 64; and 18.2% were 65 years of age or older. The gender makeup of the city was 47.6% male and 52.4% female.

2000 census
As of the census of 2000, there were 4,682 people, 1,778 households, and 1,175 families living in the city. The population density was 1,270.6 people per square mile (491.2/km2). There were 1,946 housing units at an average density of 528.1 per square mile (204.2/km2). The racial makeup of the city was 91.56% White, 5.28% African American, 0.43% Native American, 0.53% Asian, 0.68% from other races, and 1.52% from two or more races. Hispanic or Latino of any race were 1.50% of the population.

There were 1,778 households, out of which 33.2% had children under the age of 18 living with them, 49.0% were married couples living together, 12.8% had a female householder with no husband present, and 33.9% were non-families. 29.6% of all households were made up of individuals, and 13.9% had someone living alone who was 65 years of age or older. The average household size was 2.39 and the average family size was 2.94.

In the city the population was spread out, with 24.9% under the age of 18, 8.0% from 18 to 24, 26.4% from 25 to 44, 20.6% from 45 to 64, and 20.2% who were 65 years of age or older. The median age was 39 years. For every 100 females, there were 83.5 males. For every 100 females age 18 and over, there were 80.7 males.

The median income for a household in the city was $31,497, and the median income for a family was $40,511. Males had a median income of $31,291 versus $21,596 for females. The per capita income for the city was $17,982. About 7.1% of families and 8.4% of the population were below the poverty line, including 10.5% of those under age 18 and 9.7% of those age 65 or over.

Ancestries were German 34.8%, Irish 10.7%, English 10.1%, United States 9.2%, French 3.1%, Scotch 2.3%, the census reported.

Education
Public education in Higginsville is administered by Lafayette County C-1 School District, which operates one elementary school, one middle school and Lafayette County High School. Immanuel Lutheran School is a private institution.

Higginsville has a public library, the Robertson Memorial Library.

Notable people
 William J. Cason, lawyer and politician
 Jon Garrison, opera singer
 John Clark Salyer II, "Father of the National Wildlife Refuge System", principal architect for President Franklin D. Roosevelt's duck restoration program of 1934–36.  J. Clark Salyer National Wildlife Refuge
 George Seals, professional football player
 Lee Shippey, journalist
 Alonzo "Skip" Thomas, football player

References

External links
 Official website
 Historic maps of Higginsville in the Sanborn Maps of Missouri Collection at the University of MissouriDigital Library

Cities in Lafayette County, Missouri
Cities in Missouri
Populated places established in 1869
1869 establishments in Missouri